Damlı is a village in the Şirvan District of Siirt Province in Turkey. The village is populated by Kurds of the Sturkiyan tribe and had a population of 430 in 2021.

References 

Kurdish settlements in Siirt Province
Villages in Şirvan District